Liam Scott (born 12 December 2000) is an Australian cricketer. He made his first-class debut on 29 November 2019, for South Australia in the 2019–20 Sheffield Shield season. In December 2019, he was named in Australia's squad for the 2020 Under-19 Cricket World Cup. He made his Twenty20 debut on 20 December 2020, for the Adelaide Strikers, in the 2020–21 Big Bash League season. He made his List A debut on 15 February 2022, for South Australia in the 2021–22 Marsh One-Day Cup.

References

External links
 

2000 births
Living people
Australian cricketers
South Australia cricketers
Adelaide Strikers cricketers
Place of birth missing (living people)